Henry Lake may refer to:

Henry Lake (Halifax County), Nova Scotia
Henry Lake (District of Chester) in Chester, Nova Scotia
Henry Lake (Vancouver Island) on Vancouver Island, British Columbia
Henry Atwell Lake (1808–1881), colonel of the Royal Engineers in England

See also

Harry Lake (disambiguation)
Lake Henry (disambiguation)